Crambus alienellus is a species of moth of the family Crambidae. It is found in Northern and Central Europe, Ussuri, Central Asia and Daghestan. Subspecies Crambus alienellus labradoriensis is found in Canada.

Subspecies
Crambus alienellus alienellus
Crambus alienellus labradoriensis Christoph, 1858 (Canada)
Crambus alienellus dissectus Grote, 1880

External links
 Swedish Moths

Crambini
Moths described in 1817
Moths of Europe
Moths of Asia
Moths of North America